Sekou Baradji (born 24 April 1984) is a French professional footballer. A midfielder, he plays for FC Istres. He also holds Senegalese citizenship.

Career in England
Baradji signed for West Ham United on the transfer deadline, 31 August 2005. He was immediately loaned to Reading. He had been on trial with Derby; Burnley tried to offer him a contract before West Ham signed the midfielder.
He only made three appearances for the Royals, twice in the Football League Cup and once in the league, a substitute appearance against Sheffield United in which Baradji's free kick allowed Brynjar Gunnarsson to score the winner in a pivotal first-against-second match.
Reading did not extend Baradji's loan and West Ham later released him.

In 2010 Baradji was on trial with Premier League club Wigan Athletic and played in their pre-season friendly draw with Oldham Athletic. He also travelled to Austria with the team and played in their 4–1 victory over NK Rudar on 26 July 2010.

References

External links
 
 

Living people
1986 births
Association football midfielders
French footballers
French sportspeople of Senegalese descent
French sportspeople of Ivorian descent
French expatriate footballers
Footballers from Paris
Le Mans FC players
Reading F.C. players
West Ham United F.C. players
Tours FC players
FC Martigues players
Associação Naval 1º de Maio players
Dijon FCO players
Valenciennes FC players
Amiens SC players
FC Istres players
Ligue 1 players
Ligue 2 players
English Football League players
Primeira Liga players
Expatriate footballers in England
Expatriate footballers in Portugal
Expatriate footballers in Israel